Maurice Cornelius O'Donoghue (born 1950) is an Irish actor best known for his role as Father Dick Byrne on Father Ted.

His character in Father Ted is well known for his long running feud with Ted, mainly in Ludo competitions and the over 75s football tournament. In 1997 he appeared as Eamonn in three episodes of EastEnders.

O'Donoghue is a member of the Theatrical Cavaliers Cricket club, and has captained the team on many occasions.

Filmography

Film

Television

External links
 

Living people
1950 births
Irish male television actors
Irish male film actors